Judith Mary Troeth AM (born 3 August 1940) is a former Australian politician who served as a Liberal member of the Australian Senate from 1993 to 2011, representing the state of Victoria. She was born in Melbourne, Victoria, and was educated at the Methodist Ladies' College, and later at the University of Melbourne, where she graduated in arts and education. She was a teacher and farmer before entering politics.

Troeth was Parliamentary Secretary to the Minister for Primary Industries and Energy 1997-98 and Parliamentary Secretary to the Minister for Agriculture, Fisheries and Forestry 1998–2004.

In January 2009, Troeth announced she would not be contesting the next election and would retire at the end of her term in June 2011.

References

External links
Judith Troeth's website
 

1940 births
Living people
Liberal Party of Australia members of the Parliament of Australia
Members of the Australian Senate
Members of the Australian Senate for Victoria
Politicians from Melbourne
Women members of the Australian Senate
Members of the Order of Australia
People educated at Methodist Ladies' College, Melbourne
21st-century Australian politicians
21st-century Australian women politicians
20th-century Australian politicians
20th-century Australian women politicians